Springhill is an unincorporated community in Clay County, Alabama, United States.

References

Unincorporated communities in Clay County, Alabama
Unincorporated communities in Alabama